Antonio Fantin (born 3 August 2001) is an Italian swimmer who competes in Paralympic S5 and SM5 (individual medley) events.

Fantin is an athlete of the Gruppo Sportivo Fiamme Oro.

Career history
Fantin began swimming at age four in Lignano Sabbiadoro, Italy. He came to international attention when he competed at the 2017 World Para Swimming Championships, at the age of 16, winning the 400 metres freestyle S6 category.

The following year Fantin was reclassified as S5, and represented Italy again at the 2018 World Para Swimming European Championships in Dublin, Ireland. Fantin won 4 gold medals, and six medals in all, to make the top 5 individual performances of the meet.

See also
 Italy at the 2020 Summer Paralympics

References

External links 
 

2001 births
Living people
Italian male swimmers
Paralympic swimmers of Italy
S5-classified Paralympic swimmers
S6-classified Paralympic swimmers
Swimmers of Fiamme Oro
Medalists at the World Para Swimming Championships
Medalists at the World Para Swimming European Championships
Swimmers at the 2020 Summer Paralympics
Medalists at the 2020 Summer Paralympics
Paralympic gold medalists for Italy
Paralympic silver medalists for Italy
Paralympic bronze medalists for Italy
Paralympic medalists in swimming
Paralympic athletes of Fiamme Gialle
21st-century Italian people